Latvia participated in the Eurovision Song Contest 2003 with the song "Hello from Mars" written by Mārtiņš Freimanis and Lauris Reiniks. The song was performed by the group F.L.Y. In addition to participating in the contest, the Latvian broadcaster Latvijas Televīzija (LTV) also hosted the Eurovision Song Contest after winning the competition in 2002 with the song "I Wanna" performed by Marie N. LTV organised the national final Eirodziesma 2003 in order to select the Latvian entry for the 2003 contest in Riga. Fifteen songs were selected to compete in the national final on 1 February 2003 where two rounds of public televoting selected "Hello from Mars" performed by F.L.Y. as the winner.

As the host country, Latvia qualified to compete directly in the final of the Eurovision Song Contest. Performing in position 21, Latvia placed twenty-fourth out of the 26 participating countries with 5 points.

Background 

Prior to the 2003 contest, Latvia had participated in the Eurovision Song Contest three times since its first entry in 2000. Latvia won the contest once in 2002 with the song "I Wanna" performed by Marie N. The Latvian national broadcaster, Latvijas Televīzija (LTV), which broadcasts the event within Latvia and organises the selection process for the nation's entry. Latvia has selected their entries for the Eurovision Song Contest through a national final. Since their debut in 2000, LTV had organised the selection show Eirodziesma, a selection procedure that was continued in order to select the Latvian entry for the 2003 contest.

Before Eurovision

Eirodziesma 2003 
Eirodziesma 2003 was the fourth edition of Eirodziesma, the music competition that selects Latvia's entries for the Eurovision Song Contest. The competition took place at the Olympic Center in Ventspils on 1 February 2003, hosted by Ilze Jaunalksne and Ģirts Līcis with Samija Šerifa hosting from the green room. The show was broadcast on LTV1, via radio on Latvijas Radio 1 as well as online via the broadcaster's official Eurovision Song Contest website eirovizija.lv.

Competing entries 
Artists and songwriters were able to submit their entries to the broadcaster between 3 October 2002 and 4 November 2002. 57 entries were submitted at the conclusion of the submission period; 49 of the songs were in English, 6 were in Latvian and 2 were in Russian. An international jury panel appointed by LTV evaluated the submitted songs and selected fifteen entries for the competition. The twenty competing artists and songs were announced on 15 November 2002.

Final 
The final took place on 1 February 2003. Fifteen acts competed and the winner was selected over two rounds of public televoting. In the first round, the top five songs advanced to the second round, the superfinal. In the superfinal, the results were revealed by Latvia's five regions alongside votes submitted via mobiles and the song with the highest number of votes, "Hello from Mars" performed by F.L.Y., was declared the winner. In addition to the performances of the competing entries, guest performers included Eurovision Song Contest 2002 winner Marie N, 2003 Israeli Eurovision entrant Lior Narkis and 2003 Ukrainian Eurovision entrant Olexandr Ponomariov.

At Eurovision
According to Eurovision rules, all nations with the exceptions of the bottom ten countries in the 2002 contest competed in the final. As the host country, Latvia automatically qualified to compete in the final on 24 May 2003. On 29 November 2002, a special allocation draw was held which determined the running order and Latvia was set to perform in position 21, following the entry from Poland and before the entry from Belgium. Latvia finished in twenty-fourth place with 5 points.

The show was broadcast in Latvia on LTV1 featuring commentary by Kārlis Streips. The Latvian spokesperson, who announced the Latvian votes during the final, was Ģirts Līcis.

Voting 
Below is a breakdown of points awarded to Latvia and awarded by Latvia in the contest. The nation awarded its 12 points to Russia in the contest.

References

2003
Countries in the Eurovision Song Contest 2003
Eurovision